The 550th Guided Missiles Wing is an inactive United States Air Force unit.   It was last assigned to the Long Range Proving Ground Division at Patrick Air Force Base, Florida.  It was inactivated on 30 December 1950.  From 1949 through 1950 it was the Air Force's only experimental missile unit.

History
Established as an expansion of the 1st Experimental Guided Missiles Group, the 550th Guided Missiles Wing was a short-lived unit of the Air Proving Ground, activated at Eglin Air Force Base, Florida.  Its mission  was the supervision and evaluation of guided missile service tests as opposed to pure experimentation of its predecessor unit.

As part of the 550th Wing, the former 1st Experimental Guided Missiles Squadron was inactivated; its personnel and equipment reorganized as follows:
 1st Guided Missiles Squadron.  Assigned the air-to-surface missiles and guided bomb testing program
 2d Guided Missiles Squadron.  Operated QB/DB-17 Flying Fortress drone/director aircraft drones as flying targets for the early Nike Ajax surface-to-air missile or for the Hughes Falcon air-to-air missile.  Often, the QB-17L would be the subject of intentional near misses to preserve the drone for as many missions as possible.  It also supplied B-17 drones to support the Atomic Energy Commission Nuclear Testing program.
The wing also included a headquarters squadron and a maintenance and supply squadron.

Like its predecessor, the 550th Wing had detachments in tenant status at Holloman Air Force Base and the Navy's Guided Missile Test Center at Naval Air Station Point Mugu.  While the Holloman detachment continued to assist the Glenn L. Martin Company with developmental testing of the MX-771 Matador (i.e., it witnessed test firings and reported on the results), the Point Mugu detachment completed its Navy Convair Lark missile training and moved to the Joint Long Range Proving Ground in early January 1950 

On 1 July 1950, the 3d Guided Missiles Squadron was activated at the Long Range Proving Ground Air Force Base (later Patrick Air Force Base), on the Atlantic Coast of Florida.  Its mission was to support the aerodynamic missiles being developed by the Long Range Proving Ground Division.  The squadron launched three US Navy SAM-N-2 Lark surface-to-air missiles at Cape Canaveral in October and November 1950.

The 550th Wing also continued its predecessor's support of the Atomic Energy Commission atomic bomb testing program.   However, during the wing's brief existence, no tests were scheduled.

Inactivation
By January 1950, the Air Proving Ground decided the QB/DB-17 drone mission needed to be separated from the missile testing mission.  It recommended the establishment of a separate and permanent drone squadron. Drone support personnel from the 2d Guided Missiles Squadron were subsequently transferred to a new unit, the 3201st Air Base Support Squadron, which was placed under the 3201st Air Base Group at Eglin.   While the 3201st Air Base Support Squadron was attached to the 550th for administrative purposes, its operations were essentially divorced from the 550th's missile activities when the 3200th moved to Eglin Auxiliary Field #3. In June 1951, the 3201st Squadron was upgraded to a group level as the 3200th Drone Group.

By late 1950, Air Proving Ground decided to reorganize the missile testing program.  The 550th Guided Missiles Wing was inactivated effective 30 December 1950.   The wing moved to Patrick Air Force Base in early December.  At Patrick, the resources of the 550th Wing were transferred to the new 4800th Guided Missile Wing, which consolidated all Air Proving Ground activities at the base.

The 1st Squadron terminated its gliding bomb mission and was inactivated.  The 2d Guided Missiles Squadron was inactivated at Holloman, its resources moved to Patrick and on 10 April 1951 became the 4802d Guided Missiles Squadron.  The personnel and equipment at Holloman Air Force Base became a detachment of the 3201st Air Base Support Squadron. The 3d Squadron already at Patrick was inactivated and transferred its mission, personnel and equipment to the 4803d Guided Missiles Squadron.

Lineage
 Established as 550th Guided Missiles Wing on 27 June 1959
 Activated on 20 July 1949
 Inactivated on 30 December 1950

Assignments
 Air Proving Ground, 20 July 1949
 Long Range Proving Ground Division, 1–29 December 1950

Components
 3200th Proof Test Group, 26 April-11 December 1950
 1st Guided Missiles Squadron, Air to Surface Missile, attached 20 July 1949 – 31 July 1950, assigned 1 August–30 December 1950
 2d Guided Missiles Squadron, Surface to Surface Missile, attached 20 July 1949 – 31 July 1950, assigned 1 August–30 December 1950
 3d Guided Missiles Squadron, Interceptor, 1 August 1950 – 30 December 1950
 550th Maintenance Squadron, Guided Missiles, 20 July 1949 – 30 December 1950
 3200th Drone Squadron, attached 26 April 1950 – 30 June 1950, assigned 1 July–1 December 1950, 1 July-1 December 1950

Stations
 Eglin Air Force Base, Florida, 20 July 1949
 Patrick Air Force Base, Florida, 11–30 December 1950

Detachments:
 Detachment 1: Naval Air Station Point Mugu, California, 21 July 1949 – 31 January 1950
 Detachment 2: Holloman Air Force Base, New Mexico, 7 November 1949 – 25 October 1950
 Detachment 3: Patrick Air Force Base, Florida, 6–11 December 1950

Aircraft
 Boeing B-17 Flying Fortress (1949-1950)
 DB-17 Flying Fortress: Drone director aircraft
 MB-17 Flying Fortress: Airborne missile/gliding bomb launcher
 QB-17 Flying Fortress: Unmanned drone aircraft used as aerial weapons targets
 Boeing B-29 Superfortress (1949-1950)
 Lockheed T-33 T-Bird (1950)
 Lockheed F-80 Shooting Star
 North American F-86 Sabre (1950)

Missiles
 SAM-N-2 Lark
 MX-771 Matador
 SAM-A-1 GAPA
 AAM-A-2 Falcon
 Bell X-9 Shrike
 ASM-A-2 RASCAL
 SM-62 Snark
 SSM-A-5 Boojum

See also
 List of United States Air Force missile squadrons

References

Notes
 Explanatory notes

 Citations

Bibliography
 
 
 
 

Missile wings of the United States Air Force
Military units and formations established in 1949
Military units and formations disestablished in 1950
1949 establishments in Florida
1950 disestablishments in Florida